Lake Liddell is located between Muswellbrook and Singleton, in the Hunter Region, New South Wales, Australia.

Lake Liddell supplies cooling water for Liddell Power Station, and was expanded to accommodate its needs during construction of the power station.

Lake Liddell was closed for public use in March 2016 after Naegleria fowleri, a brain-eating amoeba, was discovered in the lake.

See also
 Liddell Power Station, New South Wales
 Bayswater Power Station, New South Wales

References 

Liddell
Muswellbrook Shire